LWV may refer to:
 League of Women Voters
 Lehr und Wehr Verein, a Chicago-based socialist military organization founded in 1875
 Lawrenceville–Vincennes International Airport's IATA code
 , the prefix for numbering compositions by Jean-Baptiste Lully